The Listroscelidinae are a subfamily of the Tettigoniidae  found in the Americas, Madagascar, and Australia.

Tribes and genera 
The Orthoptera Species File lists the following tribes and genera:
 Conocephalomimini Rentz, 2001
 Conocephalomima Rentz, 2001
 Listroscelidini Redtenbacher, 1891
 Carliella Karny, 1911
 Cerberodon Perty, 1832
 Isocarliella Mello-Leitão, 1940
 Listroscelis Serville, 1831
 Macrometopon Bruner, 1915
 Monocerophora Walker, 1869
 Venatorellus Mendes, Chamorro-Rengifo & Rafael, 2016
 Requenini Rentz, 2001
 Requena Walker, 1869
 Thumelinia Rentz, 2001
 Xingbaoia Rentz, 2001
 Terpandrini Gorochov, 1990
 Burnuia Rentz, 2001
 Chlorobalius Tepper, 1896
 Megatympanon Piza, 1958
 Neobarrettia Rehn, 1901
 Terpandrus Stål, 1874
 Yullandria Rentz, 2001
 Yutjuwalia Rentz, 2001
 Tribe not established
 Alinjarria Rentz, Su & Ueshima, 2007
 Liostethomimus Karny, 1914
 Paralistroscelis Carl, 1908

References

External links

Tettigoniidae
Orthoptera subfamilies
Orthoptera of South America
Orthoptera of Australia